Gossamer-wings are the smallest butterflies. Their wingspans range from 0.5-2.0 inches (1.2-5.1 cm). There are about 7,000 species worldwide with about 139 species in North America. Gossamer-wings include the subfamilies hairstreaks, harvesters, coppers, and blues. Their flights vary from the fast, erratic hairstreaks to the slow, bouncy blues. They like to feed at flowers, and males like to puddle at damp ground. Most male gossamer-wings locate females by perching, while some males patrol. The turban-shaped eggs are usually laid singly. The larva is oval shaped with a flattened underside. Some species have honeydew glands that attract ants. Ants like to eat and collect the honeydew made by the caterpillar. In turn, the ants will swarm over anything that might try to harm the larva. The chrysalis is usually formed in leaf litter. Many chrysalises can make faint noises. Scientists believe this noise might ward off predatory ants.

Subfamily Miletinae: harvesters

 Harvester, Feniseca tarquinius

Subfamily Lycaeninae: coppers

 Tailed copper, Lycaena arota
 Lustrous copper, Lycaena cupreus
 Snow's lustrous copper, Lycaena cupreus snowi
 Gray copper, Lycaena dione
 Dorcas copper, Lycaena dorcas
 Maine dorcas copper, Lycaena dorcas claytoni
 Salt marsh dorcas copper, Lycaena dorcas dospassosi
 Edith's copper, Lycaena editha
 Bog copper, Lycaena epixanthe
 Gorgon copper, Lycaena goron
 Purplish copper, Lycaena helloides
 Hermes copper, Lycaena hermes
 Blue copper, Lycaena heteronea
 Bronze copper, Lycaena hyllus
 Mariposa copper, Lycaena mariposa
 Lilac-bordered copper, Lycaena nivalis
 American copper, Lycaena phlaeas
 Ruddy copper, Lycaena rubidus
 White Mountains copper, Lycaena rubidus ferrisi
 Great copper, Lycaena xanthoides

Subfamily Theclinae: hairstreaks

 Colorado hairstreak, Hypaurotia crysalus
 Golden hairstreak, Habrodais grunus
 Atala, Eumaeus atala
 Superb cycadian, Eumaeus childrenae
 Strophius hairstreak, Allosmaitia strophius
 Great purple hairstreak, Atlides halesus
 Creamy stripe-streak, Arawacus jada
 Gold-bordered hairstreak, Rekoa palegon
 Smudged hairstreak, Rekoa stagira
 Marius hairstreak, Rekoa marius
 Black hairstreak, Ocaria ocrisia
 Amethyst hairstreak, Chlorostrymon maesites
 Telea hairstreak, Chlorostrymon telea
 Silver-banded hairstreak, Chlorostrymon simaethis
 Soapberry hairstreak, Phaeostrymon alcestis
 Coral hairstreak, Satyrium titus
 Behr's hairstreak, Satyrium behrii
 Sooty hairstreak, Satyrium fuliginosum
 Acadian hairstreak, Satyrium acadica
 California hairstreak, Satyrium californica
 Sylvan hairstreak, Satyrium sylvinus
 Edward's hairstreak, Satyrium edwardsii
 Banded hairstreak, Satyrium calanus
 Hickory hairstreak, Satyrium caryaevorum
 King's hairstreak, Satyrium kingi
 Striped hairstreak, Satyrium liparops
 Gold-hunter's hairstreak, Satyrium auretorum
 Mountain mahogany hairstreak, Satyrium tetra
 Hedgerow hairstreak, Satyrium saepium
 Oak hairstreak, Satyrium favonius
 Southern oak hairstreak, Satyrium favonius favonius
 Northern oak hairstreak, Satyrium favonius ontario
 Ilavia hairstreak, Satyrium ilavia
 Poling's hairstreak, Satyrium polingi
 Clench's greenstreak, Cyanophrys miserabilis
 Goodson's greenstreak, Cyanophrys goodsoni
 Cramer's greenstreak, Cyanophrys amyntor
 Tropical greenstreak, Cyanophrys herodotus
 Brown-spotted greenstreak, Cyanophrys longula
 Bramble hairstreak, Callophrys dumetorum
 Bramble bramble hairstreak, Callophrys dumetorum dumetorum
 Coastal bramble hairstreak, Callophrys dumetorum viridis
 Canyon bramble hairstreak, Callophrys dumetorum apama
 Immaculate bramble hairstreak, Callophys dumetorum affinis
 Sheridan's hairstreak, Callophrys sheridanii
 White-lined Sheridan's hairstreak, Callophrys sheridanii sheridanii
 Desert Sheridan's hairstreak, Callophrys sheridanii comstocki
 Alpine Sheridan's hairstreak, Callophrys sheridanii lemberti
 Xami hairstreak, Callophrys xami
 Sandia hairstreak, Callophrys mcfarlandi
 Brown elfin, Callophrys augustinus
 Desert elfin, Callophrys fotis
 Moss's elfin, Callophrys mossii
 Hoary elfin, Callophrys polios
 Frosted elfin, Callophrys irus
 Henry's elfin, Callophrys henrici
 Bog elfin, Callophrys lanoraieensis
 Eastern pine elfin, Callophrys niphon
 Western pine elfin, Callophrys eryphon
 Thicket hairstreak, Callophrys spinetorum
 Johnson's hairstreak, Callophrys johnsoni
 Juniper hairstreak, Callophrys gryneus
 Olive juniper hairstreak, Callophrys gryneus gryneus
 Sweadner's juniper hairstreak, Callophrys gryneus sweadneri
 Siva juniper hairstreak, Callophrys gryneus siva
 Nelson's juniper hairstreak, Callophrys gryneus nelsoni
 Muir's juniper hairstreak, Callophrys gryneus muiri
 Loki's juniper hairstreak, Callophrys gryneus loki
 Thorne's juniper hairstreak, Callophrys gryneus thornei
 Hessel's hairstreak, Callophrys hesseli
 Aquamarine hairstreak, Oenomaus ortygnus
 Broken-M hairstreak, Parrhasius polibetes
 White M hairstreak, Parrhasius m-album
 Mexican-M hairstreak, Parhassius moctezuma
 Gray hairstreak, Strymon melinus
 Avalon scrub-hairstreak, Strymon avalona
 Red-crescent scrub-hairstreak, Strymon rufofusca
 Red-lined scrub-hairstreak, Strymon bebrycia
 Martial scrub-hairstreak, Strymon martialis
 Yojoa scrub-hairstreak, Strymon yojoa
 White scrub-hairstreak, Strymon albata
 Bartram's scrub-hairstreak, Strymon acis
 Lacey's scrub-hairstreak, Strymon alea
 Mallow scrub-hairstreak, Strymon istapa
 Disguised scrub-hairstreak, Strymon limenia
 Tailless scrub-hairstreak, Strymon cestri
 Lantana scrub-hairstreak, Strymon bazochii
 Bromeliad scrub-hairstreak, Strymon serapio
 Confusing scrub-hairstreak, Strymon megarus
 Orange-crescent groundstreak, Ziegleria guzanta
 Ruddy hairstreak, Electrostrymon sangala
 Fulvous hairstreak, Electrostrymon angelia
 Muted hairstreak, Electrostrymon canus
 Red-banded hairstreak, Calycopis cecrops
 Dusky-blue groundstreak, Calycopis isobeon
 Susanna's groundstreak, Calycopis origo
 Red-spotted hairstreak, Tmolus echion
 Pearly-gray hairstreak, Siderus tephraeus
 Leda ministreak, Ministrymon leda
 Clytie ministreak, Ministrymon clytie
 Red-flocked ministreak, Ministrymon phrutus
 Gray ministreak, Ministrymon azia
 Vicroy's ministreak, Ministrymon janevicroy
 Sonoran hairstreak, Hypostrymon critola
 Early hairstreak, Erora laeta
 Arizona hairstreak, Erora quaderna

Subfamily Polyommatinae: blues

 Heather blue, Agriades cassiope
 Arctic blue, Agriades glandon
 Cranberry blue, Agriades optilete
 Sierra Nevada blue, Agriades podarce
 Western pygmy blue, Brephidium exilis
 Eastern pygmy blue, Brephidium isophthalma
 Echo azure, Celastrina echo
 Baker's echo azure, Celastrina echo bakeri
 Arizona echo azure, Celastrina echo cinerea
 Mexican echo azure, Celastrina echo gozora
 Dark echo azure, Celastrina echo nigrescens
 Front Range echo azure, Celastrina echo sidara
 Hops azure, Celastrina humulus
 Holly azure, Celastrina idella
 Spring azure, Celastrina ladon
 Northern azure, Celastrina lucia
 Colorado northern azure, Celastrina lucia lumarco
 Summer azure, Celastrina neglecta
 Manitoba summer azure, Celastrina neglecta argentata
 Appalachian azure, Celastrina neglectamajor
 Dusky azure, Celastrina nigra
 Cherry gall azure, Celastrina serotina
 Western tailed-blue, Cupido amyntula
 Eastern tailed-blue, Cupido comyntas
 Nickerbean blue, Cyclargus ammon
 Miami blue, Cyclargus thomasi
 Reakirt's blue, Echinargus isola
 Square-spotted blue, Euphilotes battoides
 El Segundo square-spotted blue, Euphilotes battoides allyni
 Bauer's square-spotted blue, Euphilotes battoides baueri
 Bernardino square-spotted blue, Euphilotes battoides bernardino
 Central square-spotted blue, Euphilotes battoides centralis
 Ellis's square-spotted blue, Euphilotes battoides ellisi
 Euphilotes battoides intermedia
 Dotted blue, Euphilotes enoptes
 Ancilla dotted blue, Euphilotes enoptes ancilla
 Dammer's dotted blue, Euphilotes enoptes dammersi
 Mojave dotted blue, Euphilotes enoptes mojave
 Rita blue, Euphilotes rita
 Pale Rita blue, Euphilotes rita pallescens
 Spalding's blue, Euphilotes spaldingi
 Silvery blue, Glaucopsyche lygdamus
 Arrowhead blue, Glaucopsyche piasus
 Ceraunus blue, Hemiargus ceraunus
 Acmon blue, Icaricia acmon
 Boisduval's blue, Icaricia icarioides
 Mission Boisduval's blue, Icaricia icarioides missionensis
 Lupine blue, Icaricia lupini
 Veined blue, Icaricia neurona
 Greenish blue, Icaricia saepiolus
 Shasta blue, Icaricia shasta
 Pea blue, Lampides boeticus
 Cassius blue, Leptotes cassius
 Marine blue, Leptotes marina
 Sonoran blue, Philotes sonorensis
 Small blue, Philotiella speciosa
 Philotiella speciosa leona
 Northern blue, Plebejus idas
 Melissa blue, Plebejus melissa
 Karner Melissa blue, Plebejus melissa samuelis
 San Emigdio blue, Plebulina emigdionis
 Cyna blue, Zizula cyna
 Lesser grass-blue, Zizina otis

References
Jim P. Brock, Kenn Kaufman (2003). Butterflies of North America. Boston: Houghton Mifflin. .

North America
Lycaenidae